Velho Chico (English title: Old River) is a Brazilian telenovela produced and broadcast by TV Globo that premiered on 14 March 2016, replacing A Regra do Jogo, and ended on 30 September 2016, being followed by A Lei do Amor.

Created by Benedito Ruy Barbosa, Edmara Barbosa and Bruno Luperi in collaboration with Luis Alberto de Abreu, Velho Chico is artistically directed by Luiz Fernando Carvalho together with: Carlos Araújo, Gustavo Fernandez, Antônio Karnewale and Philipe Barcinski.

Initially conceived to be a 6 pm telenovela, set to premiere in August 2016, after Êta Mundo Bom!, it was released earlier as a 9 pm telenovela. With two distinct phases, the telenovela had a total of 172 episodes in its original run. Velho Chico faced unprecedented challenges during its production; with Umberto Magnani and Domingos Montagner untimely deaths. On the wake of Montagner's passing on 15 September 2016, two weeks before the scheduled finale, production became uncertain.

The first phase features performances by Rodrigo Santoro, Carol Castro, Julia Dalavia, Renato Góes, Selma Egrei, Tarcísio Meira, Rodrigo Lombardi, Fabiula Nascimento, Chico Díaz and Cyria Coentro. The second phase set years later, features Antonio Fagundes, Christiane Torloni, Camila Pitanga, Domingos Montagner, Marcos Palmeira, Selma Egrei, Dira Paes, Irandhir Santos, Gabriel Leone, Giullia Buscacio and Lucy Alves.

The telenovela attracted moderate viewership but still considered low. Velho Chico received a nomination from the International Emmy Award for Best Telenovela in 2017.

Production 
In 2009, Benedito Ruy Barbosa submitted to Rede Globo the synopsis of possible telenovela set at the  São Francisco River but after evaluation by the network, the story was considered too political. Barbosa hoped to shoot it the following year in the 9 pm time slot.

In 2015, the project was approved by Rede Globo and was set to premiere just after Êta Mundo Bom! at 6 pm timeslot. Rogério Gomes was later announced to direct but on request of the show's author and O Rei do Gado reprise's success, Luiz Fernando Carvalho was offered to direct.

Initially, a telenovela by Maria Adelaide Amaral was supposed to replace A Regra do Jogo but due to its heavily politically-themed storyline—it being an election year—Velho Chico was moved to the primetime timeslot and Amaral's show moved to late 2016.

Scenography and set design 
Although set in Bahia, part of the early scenes were recorded in other locations of the Brazil's Northeast like: Baraúna in Rio Grande do Norte, São José da Tapera and Olho d'Água do Casado in Alagoas. Other locations that represent the fictional town of the plot are the Alagoan other municipality: Piranhas. Ilha de Cajaíba, in São Francisco do Conde, the municipality of Cachoeira and Raso da Catarina were also used as locations. In total, about 562 scenes were recorded in northern locations and about 60 to 70% of the cast were from the region.
The set design was made  from recycled objects, such as incandescent lamps used in old rebuilt reflectors. The costume design in the first phase was composed of regal robes from residents in location. Passing through tissue discoloration, dyeing and natural aging, the costumes of the bushmen are made in pastel colors, while those from Salvador are inspired by Tropicália.

Casting 
Eriberto Leão was considered in the starring role for the first phase but was replaced by Rodrigo Santoro. The director, Luiz Fernando Carvalho, opted for a Spanish actress to portray the character Iolanda. Due to great importance of the character to the storyline, Carol Castro and Christiane Torloni were cast nonetheless. Before Castro was considered, Ana Paula Arósio was cast but dropped out due to scheduling conflicts. After Arósio, Maria Fernanda Cândido was then considered but she also turned down the role. Letícia Sabatella was also considered to play Maria Tereza but due to her other commitments in films and theatre, Camila Pitanga was cast.

Death of Umberto Magnani
Veteran actor Umberto Magnani, who played Father Romão, suffered a stroke (CVA) while preparing to record in the afternoon of 25 April 2016 at Projac. He was hospitalized at Hospital Vitória, near the studios' complex in Barra da Tijuca, in a deep coma. Ana Julia, daughter of Magnani, said that the actor underwent a six-hour surgery and suffered a cardiac arrest. As the character was considered important to the plot, several scenes had to be rewritten. At the time, without the possibility to return to the plot, Magnani was replaced by Carlos Vereza, who went on to interpret Father Benício. Magnani eventually passed away two days later.

Death of Domingos Montagner
With only two weeks to the final episode, on 15 September 2016, actor Domingos Montagner, who portrayed the protagonist Santo, drowned at the São Francisco River, located in the Canindé, Region of São Francisco, in Sergipe. Montagner was swimming along with his co-star Camila Pitanga before being dragged by a strong current. The actor was found four hours later, lifeless. While Montagner was missing, Globo's management requested that Velho Chicos recordings set to run until 18 September, to be  halted. With the confirmation of the actor's death, the technical team and the cast that were recording in the Northeast were asked to return to Rio de Janeiro. The network also requested that the cast or crew not comment on the matter to the press.

Benedito Ruy Barbosa lamented on the death of Montagner and said in an interview with UOL about the uncertainty about the outcome of the actor's character in the plot:  Consulted by the blog of Patrícia Kogut , for the newspaper O Globo, Barbosa also admitted that he did not know what he would do at the time, that his aim was to honour Montagner.

According to reports the Legal Medical Institute (IML) of Sergipe, the result of the autopsy performed Montagner's body pointed out that the actor died of mechanical asphyxia by drowning.
The Brazilian version of online magazine The Intercept speculated that the strong currents where the actor drowned were caused by the hydroelectric dam, the Xingó Dam, upstream. The dam lies approximately two kilometers upstream, and the flow rate allowed through the dam can affect currents.

At the time of his death, the filming of Velho Chico was just a few days from completion. Only five episodes were ready to be aired and there was uncertainty whether the show would remain on the air or the ending would be advanced. On 16 September 2016, it was confirmed that production would resume on 18 September, and that the telenovela would end on the scheduled airdate. UOL also revealed that the character of Montagner would be carried to the end, without a substitute. However, climactic scenes for the finale, in which Montagner was the main character, hadn't been filmed yet. Production decided to complete filming as scheduled. Scenes in which Montagner's character, Santo, would have appeared would be shot from the character's point of view. Thus, Santo would be present in the scene, but would not be seen.

Weeks prior to the casualty, Rede Globo aired a scene where Santo would be saved by Indians, who found him unconscious floating on the São Francisco River, having been shot by his enemy. The river was the same where the actor lost his life.

Plot 
Described by the director as a Shakespearian family saga, counting a history of love framed for social critics, the plot is initiated in the end of the year 1960, when Afrânio, son of a powerful Colonel Jacinto is obliged to return from Salvador for the fictitious Grotas de São Francisco, to assume the place of his father, who commanded the politics and the local economy. He develops a passion for Iolanda, but to oblige his mother, Encarnação, who still grieves the loss of her oldest son who died in waters of the São Francisco River, Afrânio leaves on a trip for the region to reaffirm alliances that his father kept. During his trip, Afrânio gets involved with Leonor, whose father compels them to marry. Leonor is received with disdain by Encarnação. In Encarnação's mind, Leonor's lower class status makes her an unsuitable wife for Encarnação's son. When Maria Tereza is born, Encarnação rubs on Leonor that she should have conceived a son.
The rival family of the Ribeiro, due to Colonel Jacinto aspiring to their lands, is headed by Captain Ernesto Rosa. He is married to Eulália, but they have no children. They adopt Luzia, a baby abandoned on the road side on the way to their cotton plantation. At the same time, the couple receive the retirante, Belmiro and Piedade - parents of Bento and Santo. With the passing of time and growing-up together, Luzia starts to nourish a passion for Santo. This disrupts their feelings of brother and sister.

It is in a procession of Francis of Assisi, under waters of the Old Chico, that the path of Santo and Maria Tereza are crossed. But the love affair between the son of the retirante with the daughter of the Colonel is discovered. Maria Tereza is sent to a boarding school in Salvador. In her letters to Santo, she discloses she is pregnant. This is not taken well by Luzia who is still in love with Santo. Some time later, Miguel is born, a fruit of a forbidden love. Soon after, Maria Tereza returns to the farm. She marries Carlos Eduardo even though she is not in love with him, but still dreams of reuniting with Santo.

Cast

First phase

Second phase

Soundtrack

Volume 1

Orchestras 
Velho Chico Música Original de Tim Rescala was released on 10 June 2016. It contains instrumental soundtracks produced by Tim Rescala.

Volume 2

Ratings

The first chapter of the Velho Chico, according to consolidated data of São Paulo, registered 35.4 points with a maximum of 37, achieving the highest ratings for a premiere of the 9pm telenovela since Amor à Vida (2013). In Rio de Janeiro, the premiere recorded 38 point average. The second chapter registered 33.9 points in São Paulo and 37 points in Rio de Janeiro, representing a reduction of one point in both regions.

The last episode registered a viewership rating of 35.2 points in Greater São Paulo, one of the lowest indices in a 9pm telenovela coming after Babilônia.

Generally, Velho Chico had a viewership rating of 29 points, surpassing both Babilônia and A Regra do Jogo with 25 and 28 points respectively.

Awards and nominations

References

External links 
  
 
 Luiz Fernando Carvalho - Official website 

2016 telenovelas
Brazilian telenovelas
2016 Brazilian television series debuts
TV Globo telenovelas
2016 Brazilian television series endings
Telenovelas directed by Luiz Fernando Carvalho
Portuguese-language telenovelas